George Hadfield (1763 – 6 February 1826) was born in Livorno, Italy, of English parents, who were hotel keepers. He studied at the Royal Academy, and worked with James Wyatt for six years before emigrating to the United States. He was the brother of painter, musician, and educator Maria Cosway.

Life and career
He was appointed superintendent of the United States Capitol's construction on 15 October 1795, and continued in that position until June 1798, resigning after an argument with William Thornton. He is credited with part of the design of the original Capitol building such as the north wing, but little of the related papers remain.

He is buried in Congressional Cemetery in Washington, D.C.

List of works
 Original Treasury Department building, drew plans in 1798, completed in 1800; partially destroyed by fire in 1801 and burned by British forces in 1814
 Navy Department, 1800
 Washington Jail, 1801, later converted to a hospital, burned in 1861
 Marine Corps Commandant's House, 1801–1805
 Arlington House (Custis-Lee Mansion), 1818
 District of Columbia City Hall, 1820
 Van Ness Mausoleum

Possible works
 Historic Huntley

Other
There are other works. However they are not easily identified, since they are not in the Greek Revival style.  For example, Hadfield is credited with alterations to The Octagon House.

Gallery

See also
 Étienne Sulpice Hallet
 James Hoban
 Benjamin Latrobe

Notes

References

External links
Historical Marker for Executive Office Building
Historical Marker for Huntley
Library of Congress Built in America (Search "George Hadfield")
District of Columbia City Hall, 451 Indiana Avenue Northwest, Washington, District of Columbia, DC

1763 births
1826 deaths
18th-century American architects
18th-century English architects
Burials at the Congressional Cemetery
People from Livorno
English emigrants to the United States
19th-century American architects